General Holmes may refer to:

Arthur Holmes Jr. (born 1931), U.S. Army major general
Henry Holmes (British Army officer) (1703–1762), British Army lieutenant general
James M. Holmes (born 1957), U.S. Air Force general
John Holmes (British Army officer) (born 1949), British Army major general
Julius C. Holmes (1899–1968), U.S. Army brigadier general
Matt Holmes (Royal Marines officer) (1967–2021), Royal Marines major general
Noel Holmes (1891–1982), British Army major general
Theophilus H. Holmes (1804–1880), Confederate States Army lieutenant general
William Holmes (Australian general) (1862–1917), Australian Army major general
William Holmes (British Army officer) (1892–1969), British Army lieutenant general

See also
General Holm (disambiguation)